The 2008 Montreux Volley Masters was held in Montreux, Switzerland between 4 June and 8 June 2008. In the tournament participated 6 teams. The team of Cuba won the Tournament, China placed 2nd and Italy 3rd.

Participated teams

 China
 Cuba
 Germany
 Italy
 Netherlands
 Serbia

Standings

|}

Results

Final standings

Awards

 Best Scorer:    Wang Yimei
 Best Spiker:    Daimí Ramírez
 Best Blocker:   Nancy Carrillo
 Best Server:    Ivana Nešović
 Best Digger:    Kerstin Tzscherlich
 Best Receiver:  Alice Blom
 Best Setter:    Feng Kun

External links
 Official Page of 2008 Montreux Volley Masters
Federation Internationale de Volleyball

Montreux Volley Masters
Montreux Volley Masters
Montreux